The Braunschweig LF-1 Zaunkönig, (LF – Langsames Flugzeug – literally, slow aircraft), is a STOL single-seat light aircraft. It was designed in 1939 by Prof. Ing. Hermann Winter as a fool-proof trainer for novice student pilots to experience solo flight.

Design and development
The LF-1 was designed by Prof. Dr.-Ing. Hermann Winter and some of his students from the Technische Universität Braunschweig (English:Technical University of Brunswick), Lower Saxony, Germany. Winter was a former chief engineer at the Bulgarian company, DAR (Drzhavnata Aeroplanna Rabotilnitsa in Cyrillic ДАР – Държавната аеропланна работилница), where he created a line of aircraft; DAR-1, DAR-1A, DAR-2, DAR-3 Garvan, tri motor DAR-4, DAR 5 Brambar, DAR-6 and DAR-7 as well as the DAR Zdravka Vekilski and DAR Zdravka Toprakchiev gliders for the Bulgarian Army.

The LF-1 is a parasol wing monoplane with a high-set tailplane, powered by a Zündapp Z 9-092 engine delivering , able to operate from a  airstrip. The two-piece wings are set at 16° dihedral and are supported by a pair of v cabane struts and v-struts either side from approx half-span to the lower centre fuselage. Full span leading edge slats extend automatically and full span trailing edge flaps / drooping ailerons can be extended manually by the pilot. The fixed tailwheel undercarriage attaches to the fuselage with long struts and oleo pneumatic shock absorbers.

It was a proof-of-concept design for a 'fool-proof' trainer intended for novice pilots with only one hour of ground instruction, the hour being reduced to five-minutes for those who had already flown gliders, and was intended to be impossible to either stall or spin.

Operational history

The first prototype, the LF-1 V1, was built in 1940 and made its maiden flight, piloted by Winter himself, in December 1940. Test flights stopped in November 1942 after part of the wing ruptured causing the aircraft to crash. In 1943 a second prototype, the V2, was built, receiving the registration D-YBAR.  The aircraft was tested for military applications and was once even armed with a Panzerfaust 100 recoilless anti-tank weapon.

At the end of World War II the Zaunkönig registration D-YBAR was taken to the Royal Aircraft Establishment (RAE) at Farnborough for slow flying tests; given the British serial VX190., where amongst others, it was flown by Eric "Winkle" Brown CO Aero Flight, the aircraft also being soloed by the then-head of the RAE Aerodynamics Section, Handel Davies, after half an hour of ground instruction, and whose only previous piloting experience was as a pupil in a dual-control Miles Magister. It was sold to a British private owner in June 1949 as G-ALUA, and then to the Experimental Flying Group and to the Ultra Light Aircraft Association, subsequently in 1974 to an Irish owner, being registered EI-AYU, returning to Germany, in 1976, as D-EBCQ. As of 2008, it was preserved in the Deutsches Museum collection at Oberschleissheim near Munich.

Encouraged by the positive British reviews Prof. Ing. Hermann Winter decided to build a third LF-1. The construction started in 1954 and it was the first new aircraft in Germany after the war to receive a certificate by the Luftfahrt-Bundesamt (LBA) in Braunschweig and the registration D-EBAR. Winter envisioned the Zaunkönig as a People's Aircraft affordable for all (for a price of around DM 6,000).

At the time a fourth LF-1 V4 was already under construction and it flew a few months after the fatal accident with the V3. It received its certificate in 1958 and the registration D-ECER. This aircraft flew for some years in Germany until grounded after the death of Prof. Ing. Winter in 1968. It was restored in 1980 and flew until 1999 as D-EBCG and as of 2008 preserved in the collection of the Internationales Luftfahrtmuseum Manfred Pflumm near Villingen-Schwenningen.

Specifications (LF-1)

See also
 Tucán T-1
 I.Ae. 31 Colibrí

References
Notes

Bibliography

External links

 TU Brunswick (German)
  (German)
  (French)

1940s German civil trainer aircraft
Parasol-wing aircraft
Aircraft first flown in 1940
Single-engined tractor aircraft
Conventional landing gear
T-tail aircraft